Mount Peleus is a small peak, 1,790 m, about 3 nautical miles (6 km) west of Mount Theseus in the Olympus Range of Victoria Land. Named by the Victoria University of Wellington Antarctic Expedition (VUWAE) (1958–59) for a figure in Greek mythology.

Mountains of Victoria Land
McMurdo Dry Valleys